Sarah Frost is an English television director, animation director, composer, and storyboard artist in America.

Frost is most known for directing The Fairly OddParents and episodes of the animated series Family Guy. She has also worked in animation on The Simpsons and Rocko's Modern Life.

Family Guy
Frost joined Family Guy in 1999. She directed multiple episodes, including:
"Don't Make Me Over"
"Model Misbehavior"
"The Fat Guy Strangler" and
"Petergeist"

Partial filmography
As director
 The Jimmy Timmy Power Hour (2004)
 The Fairly OddParents (32 episodes, 2002–2005)
 The Jimmy Timmy Power Hour 2: When Nerds Collide (2006)
 Family Guy (5 episodes, 2002–2006)

As assistant director
 Family Guy (6 episodes, 2000–2003)

Animation department
 Rocko's Modern Life (8 episodes, 1993)
 King of the Hill (1997)
 The Simpsons (20 episodes, 1991–1997)
 Family Guy (4 episodes, 2001–2009)
 The Fairly OddParents (2 episodes, 2002)

As composer
 Rocko's Modern Life (16 episodes, 1993–1996)

References

External links

British television directors
British women television directors
Living people
British storyboard artists
Place of birth missing (living people)
Year of birth missing (living people)